The Legend of Cool "Disco" Dan is a 2013 American documentary film written and directed by Joseph Pattisall. The film was released on April 15, 2013 in conjunction with the release of the book Pump Me Up: DC Subculture in the 1980s. The documentary was narrated by Washington, D.C.-native Henry Rollins. The Legend of Cool "Disco" Dan provides a documentation of Washington, D.C. during the 1970s and 1980s from the perspective of Cool "Disco" Dan, and blends commentary by local Washingtonians combined with archival footage, forming a comprehensive portrait of this time period.

Synopsis

The Legend of Cool "Disco" Dan examines the life of mythical graffiti artist Cool "Disco" Dan, while juxtaposing his life against many of the historical events from the 1970s and 1980s that shaped the culture of Washington, D.C. Cool "Disco" Dan (real name Danny Hogg) was born on December 31, 1969, on the very last day of the 1960s. It was a revolutionary decade that saw the rise of Civil Rights Movement, the assassination of prominent political figures, and the Vietnam War. During this time period, D.C. was experiencing race riots in the aftermath of Martin Luther King Jr.'s assassination, heightened racial tensions and white flight, and blacks from southern and northern states relocating to D.C. in search of better economic opportunities during the Great Migration. This eventually transformed the city's demographics into a largely majority black city and introduced the label "Chocolate City". Additionally, it marked the beginning shift in local politics, and the beginning of home-grown music and musical acts (particularly go-go music and culture) all of which influenced Cool "Disco" Dan's graffiti.

Beginning in the 1970s, Hogg adapted the nickname "Disco Dan" after being inspired by an episode of What's Happening!! He was also fascinated with the murals in the opening credits of Good Times, along with the cover art of many funk albums. He taught himself to draw and eventually was able to completely duplicate the vibrant artwork of those albums. Also around this time, Marion Barry's political career was on the rise, as he was elected mayor with a platform based on helping the poor, implementing a 'summer jobs programs' for the youth, and helping senior citizens and the cities most vulnerable. The development of go-go and harDCore music was also in its early stages.

By the 1980s, Disco Dan had perfected his graffiti art skills just as the popularity of go-go music and harDCore was heightening throughout the city. Inspired by "roll-calls" and call and responses during go-go concerts (where patrons got their names and neighborhoods immortalized on P.A. tapes and live album recordings), Disco Dan began immortalizing himself by tagging his nickname on Metro buses and rails, vacant building, and throughout the Washington metropolitan area. At the height of his fame, go-go was also reaching the height of its fame, and the energy levels around the city had reached a fevering peak with the rise of local sports teams—the Washington Bullets, the Big East Conference and the Georgetown Hoyas (John Thompson, Patrick Ewing, Alonzo Mourning), Maryland Terrapins (Lefty Driesell and Len Bias), Sugar Ray Leonard, and the Washington Redskins (Doug Williams)—and the peak of the local politicians Marion Barry and Sharon Pratt Kelly, along with the crack epidemic and illegal drug trade, AIDS epidemic, materialism, hip-hop music, elevated murder rates, Reaganomics, homelessness, George H. W. Bush's War on Drugs, and the ubiquity of Cool "Disco Dan" graffiti all peaked simultaneously during this time period.

Contributors

Paul Hendrickson 
Cynthia Connolly 
Alona Wartofsky 
Iley Brown 
Jonathan Binstock 
Paul Berry 
Chuck Brown 
Gregory "Sugar Bear" Elliott 
D.C. Scorpio 
Stinky Dink 
Tony "Big Tony" Fisher 
Andre "Whiteboy" Johnson 
Big Brother CJ 
Darrell West 
Vincent Shacks 
Grevlin Trombone Hunter 
Tidy 
Big Butch 
Hollywood Breeze 
Scooter Magruder 
Frank Ski 
Marion Barry 
Walter E. Fauntroy 
Lisa of the World 
Tonya F 
Nizam Ali 
Dick Dyszel 
Asas "ULTRA" Walker 
Cycle 
Caleb Neelon 
Ken Olden 
Rob Myers 
Ian MacKaye 
Seth Hurwitz

Release

The documentary was part of the Corcoran Gallery of Art's exhibit for Pump Me Up: DC Subculture in the 1980s. The documentary also screened at the AFI Silver Theatre and Cultural Center in Silver Spring, Maryland from February 23, 2013 to March 1, 2013, and screen nationwide at select theatres. The DVD was released on March 11, 2014.

See also
Street art
Go-go 
harDCore 
Culture of Washington, D.C.
Music of Washington, D.C.
Straight Up Go-Go, 1992 documentary
Heavy Metal Parking Lot, 1986 documentary

References

External links

2013 films
2013 documentary films
American documentary films
American independent films
Culture of Washington, D.C.
Documentary films about African Americans
Documentary films about graffiti
Documentary films about visual artists
Go-go
Graffiti in the United States
2010s English-language films
2010s American films